Bennington Township may refer to:

Bennington Township, Marshall County, Illinois
Bennington Township, Michigan
Bennington Township, Mower County, Minnesota
Bennington Township, Licking County, Ohio
Bennington Township, Morrow County, Ohio

Township name disambiguation pages